This is a list of firearm cartridges which have bullets in the   caliber range.

Length refers to the cartridge case length.
OAL refers to the overall length of the cartridge.

All measurements are in mm (in).

Rimfire cartridges

Pistol cartridges

Revolver cartridges

Rifle cartridges

See also
.22 caliber

References

Pistol and rifle cartridges